is a former Japanese football player. He is currently the manager of J3 League team Kataller Toyama.

Playing career
Otagiri was born in Ishikawa Prefecture on September 2, 1978. After graduating from high school, he joined J1 League club Kyoto Purple Sanga in 1997. However, he could not play at all in the match until 1998. In 1999, he was promoted to J2 League club, Ventforet Kofu. Although he played as left side back, he could not play many matches. In 2000, he moved to Japan Football League (JFL) club Jatco TT (later Jatco). He became a regular player and played many matches. However, the club was disbanded at the end of the 2003 season. In 2004, he moved to JFL clubYKK AP (later Kataller Toyama). He played as a regular player until 2007. Although his opportunity to play decreased in 2008, the club was promoted to J2 League in 2009. He retired at end of the 2009 season.

Club statistics

Managerial statistics
Update; September 20, 2022

References

External links

kyotosangadc

1978 births
Living people
Association football people from Ishikawa Prefecture
Japanese footballers
J1 League players
J2 League players
Japan Football League players
Kyoto Sanga FC players
Ventforet Kofu players
Jatco SC players
Kataller Toyama players
Association football defenders
J3 League managers
Kataller Toyama managers